 
The Mount Mulligan mine disaster occurred on 19 September 1921 in Mount Mulligan, Far North Queensland, Australia.  A series of explosions in the local coal mine, audible as much as 30 km away, rocked the close-knit township. 

Seventy-five workers were killed by the disaster, making it the third-worst coal mining accident in Australia in terms of human lives lost. Four of the dead had been at the mouth of the pit at the time of the explosion. Seventy four bodies were recovered by the time the Royal Commission ended, the last body was recovered five months after the disaster after the mine had reopened. The disaster affected people in cities and towns all over the country. The mine, which was new at the time of the accident, was widely considered safe and had no previous indications of gas leaks. The miners hence worked using open flame lights instead of safety lamps.

Public inquiry
A Royal Commission into the accident confirmed that the disaster was caused by the accidental or negligent firing of an explosive charge on top of a block of coal, apparently in order to split it. No methane was ever detected in the mine and candles and naked flames were used throughout its history (Royal Commission: 1921).  The investigation found that explosives were used, stored, distributed and carried underground in a careless manner.  It was also determined that the lack of appropriate means to render the coal dust safe in the mine was a violation of law. The coal seams at Mt Mulligan are conspicuously dry, leading to the ignition of coal dust from the firing of the charge. The disaster was also the impetus for the passing of a Coal Mining Act in Queensland that would ban the use of open flames in underground coal mines

Aftermath
The mine was reopened after 4 months and suffered surprisingly little damage from the explosion. In 1923 the Queensland Government bought it from the operators. It was in operation until 1957, although it was heavily subsidised after World War II. The mine's final demise occurred with the completion of the Tully Falls hydro electricity scheme. Soon after, the town was sold and most of the buildings were removed.

See also

 Blantyre mining disaster
 Mount Kembla Mine disaster

References

 
  Page XXXIII, 1921 Report of the Royal Commission appointed to inquire into and report upon the recent disaster at Mount Mulligan Coal Mine, and also into the methods of mining carried on at such mine, and further, to make such recommendations as may tend to prevent the recurrence of accidents of a like nature. 
 [] Caims Post, 13 February 1922.

 The Australian Journal of Emergency Management Vol 18. No.3 August 2003.
 Walkabout.com.au  Mount Mulligan history

External links
 Mount Mulligan Mine Disaster – John Oxley Library Blog, State Library of Queensland

1920s in Queensland
1921 in Australia
1921 mining disasters
Coal mining disasters in Australia
Disasters in Queensland
Dust explosions
Far North Queensland
Mining disasters in Australia
Mining in Queensland
Public inquiries in Australia